The Lisburn Plantation is a plantation with a historic mansion in Ferriday, Louisiana, U.S.. It was built in 1852, a decade prior to the American Civil War of 1861–1865.

The house has been listed on the National Register of Historic Places on July 26, 1979 and has been apparently moved from its 1977 location some time after its listing.

See also
National Register of Historic Places listings in Concordia Parish, Louisiana

References

Notes

Houses on the National Register of Historic Places in Louisiana
Greek Revival architecture in Louisiana
Houses completed in 1852
Buildings and structures in Concordia Parish, Louisiana
Antebellum architecture
Plantations in Louisiana
1852 establishments in Louisiana